Jérémy Choplin (born 9 February 1985) is a French professional footballer who plays as a defender for Régional 1 club Afa Football Association in Corsica.

Club career
Choplin previously played in Ligue 1 for Le Mans, Bastia and Metz. On 3 August 2021, he signed with fifth-tier Championnat National 3 club Gazélec Ajaccio.

Personal life
Jérémy's brother Romain is also a footballer playing at the amateur level.

Career statistics

References

External links
 

1985 births
Living people
Footballers from Le Mans
Association football midfielders
French footballers
Ligue 1 players
Ligue 2 players
Championnat National players
Championnat National 2 players
Championnat National 3 players
Le Mans FC players
AS Beauvais Oise players
Entente SSG players
Rodez AF players
SC Bastia players
FC Metz players
Chamois Niortais F.C. players
AC Ajaccio players
Gazélec Ajaccio players